La presidenta municipal ("The Municipal President") is a 1975 Mexican comedy film directed by Fernando Cortés and starring María Elena Velasco, Adalberto Martínez "Resortes", and Pancho Córdova. The film was shot at Tlayacapan, Morelos, Mexico.

Plot
In the small town of Chipitongo el Alto (in English: High Chipitongo), the political boss Don Mario N. Cruz is the only presidential candidate of that municipality. When the town's clumsy and blind pressman Don Casimiro Buenavista prints "María" instead of "Mario" on all the ballots, the presidential candidacy automatically reverts to María Nicolasa Cruz, an illiterate and indigenous potter. Once informed, María Nicolasa accepts her new job as municipal president of Chipitongo el Alto only to rebuke the town's corrupt secretaries. Mario Nicanor Cruz, the former candidate, plans several schemes along with Lawyer Topillo in order to get rid of María.

Cast
María Elena Velasco as María Nicolasa Cruz
Adalberto Martínez as Cabo Melquiádes
Pancho Córdova as Mr. Peppermint
Fernando Soto as Don Chepito Domínguez
Joaquín García Vargas as Secretario López (credited as Joaquín García)
Raúl Meraz as Mario Nicanor Cruz
José Chávez Trowe as Pedro
Polo Ortín as Licenciado Hugo T. Topillo
Chis Chas as Pablo
Alfonso Zayas as Secretario Rodríguez
Manuel "Flaco" Ibáñez as Licenciado Cástulo Barrenillo (credited as Manuel Ibáñez)
Antonio Bravo as Sacerdote
Rosita Bouchot as Chencha
Lupita Pallás as Epigmenia (credited as Lupe Pallas)
Armando Arriola as Don Casimiro Buenavista
Ivan de Meriche as Rosendo
Rosa Furman as La Seca
Diana Ochoa as La Meca
Rolando Barral as himself
Carlos Bravo y Fernández as Director de banda municipal (credited as Carlos Bravo)
Queta Carrasco as Queta, esposa de don Casimiro
María Andrea Cantú		
Angelina Cruz		
Yolanda de Fuentes as Hija ilegítima
Gabriela de Fuentes as Gabriela Martínez
María Fernanda de Fuentes as María Fernanda Martínez
Gerardo Zepeda as Boticario
José L. Murillo as Don Salustio, cantinero
Lina Montes as Esposa del boticario (uncredited)

Trivia
Actors Pancho Córdova, José Chávez Trowe, and Rosa Furman also appear in the film Two Mules for Sister Sara (1970), also filmed in Tlayacapan, Morelos, Mexico.

External links

Mexican comedy films
1975 films
1975 comedy films
1970s Mexican films